Kim Ha-yun may refer to:
 Kim Ha-yun (skier)
 Kim Ha-yun (judoka)